The 2011 CAA men's basketball tournament was held March 4–7 at the Richmond Coliseum in Richmond, VA to crown a champion of the Colonial Athletic Association. Old Dominion, the runner up in the regular season, beat the fourth seeded VCU in the final taking them into the NCAA tournament with conferences automatic bid. Old Dominion, George Mason, and VCU each participated in the NCAA tournament, with George Mason and VCU receiving at large bids.

Bracket

Honors

See also
 Colonial Athletic Association
 2010–11 Colonial Athletic Association men's basketball season

References

Colonial Athletic Association men's basketball tournament
2010–11 Colonial Athletic Association men's basketball season
CAA men's basketball tournament
CAA men's basketball tournament
Basketball competitions in Richmond, Virginia
College basketball tournaments in Virginia